Jay Epae (7 March 1933 – 25 July 1994), born Nicholas Epae, was a Māori pop singer from Manaia, Taranaki, New Zealand. He moved to the United States in 1957. His albums were released on the American Mercury label until 1962, when he switched to American Capitol. In 1966, he switched to New Zealand's Viking Records.

His single Putti Putti was a hit in Sweden after Swedish pirate radio station Radio Nord picked it up, and he toured there soon after its release. He soon after faded out of the spotlight. In 1966, he wrote a hit single for Maria Dallas called Tumblin' Down, which won her the Loxene Golden Disc award.

He died on 25 July 1994 at the age of 61.

Discography

Albums

Awards and nominations

Aotearoa Music Awards
The Aotearoa Music Awards (previously known as New Zealand Music Awards (NZMA)) are an annual awards night celebrating excellence in New Zealand music and have been presented annually since 1965.

! 
|-
| 1966 || "I Need You" || Single of the Year ||  || 
|-

References

1933 births
1994 deaths
New Zealand pop singers
20th-century New Zealand male singers